Statistics of Emperor's Cup in the 1987 season.

Overview
It was contested by 32 teams, and Yomiuri won the championship.

Results

1st round
Yomiuri 5–0 Doshisha University
NTT Shikoku 0–2 Seino Transportation
Honda 2–0 Fujitsu
Niigata Eleven 0–9 Fujita Industries
Nissan Motors 3–1 Cosmo Oil
Hitachi 1–0 Yamaha Motors
TDK 1–10 Tokai University
Hakodate Mazda 1–7 Furukawa Electric
Mitsubishi Motors 1–0 NTT Kanto
Sapporo University 0–3Toshiba
Sumitomo Metals 5–0 Kyoto Sangyo University
Osaka University of Commerce 1–1 (PK 4–5) Yanmar Diesel
Mazda 3–0 JATCO
Kawasaki Steel Mizushima 1–5 Toyota Motors
Yawata Steel 0–2 Matsushita Electric
Fukuoka University 0–2 Nippon Kokan

2nd round
Yomiuri 3–0 Seino Transportation
Honda 0–0 (PK 8–7) Fujita Industries
Nissan Motors 4–0 Hitachi
Tokai University 0–5 Furukawa Electric
Mitsubishi Motors 0–1 Toshiba
Sumitomo Metals 3–1 Yanmar Diesel
Mazda 3–1 Toyota Motors
Matsushita Electric 0–0 (PK 4–2) Nippon Kokan

Quarterfinals
Yomiuri 1–1 (PK 4–2) Honda
Nissan Motors 1–1 (PK 2–3) Furukawa Electric
Toshiba 1–1 (PK 3–5) Sumitomo Metals
Mazda 0–0 (PK 4–2) Matsushita Electric

Semifinals
Yomiuri 0–0 (PK 4–2) Furukawa Electric
Sumitomo Metals 1–2 Mazda

Final

Yomiuri 2–0 Mazda
Yomiuri won the championship Excluded from the Asian Cup Winners' Cup 1988.

References
 NHK

Emperor's Cup
Emperor's Cup
1988 in Japanese football